(English: The Ages) or  is an opéra-ballet in a prologue and three acts by the French composer André Campra. The libretto is by Louis Fuzelier. It was first performed by the Académie royale de musique at the Théâtre du Palais-Royal on 9 October 1718.

Structure
The three acts were entitled:
 (Youth or Naive Love)
 (Manhood or Pretty Love)
 (Old Age or Playful Love)

The 1718 printed score includes a further act entitled  (Rival Ages), which is numbered as the third entrée, while  (with some alterations) is turned into the fourth entrée.

Roles

References

Further reading
 Original libretto: Les Ages, Balet Representé pour la Premiere Fois par l'Académie Royale de Musique, Le Dimanche neuf Octobre 1718, Paris, Ribou, 1718 (accessible for free online at Gallica, Bibliothèque Nationale de France)
The Viking Opera Guide ed. Holden (Viking, 1993)
Le magazine de l'opéra baroque

External links

Opéras-ballets
Operas by André Campra
French-language operas
Operas
Opera world premieres at the Paris Opera
1718 operas